A Single Man is a 2009 film directed by Tom Ford based on the novel.

A Single Man may also refer to:

 A Single Man (1929 film), a 1929 lost MGM film starring Lew Cody
 A Single Man (album), 1978 album by Elton John
 A Single Man (novel), 1964 novel by Christopher Isherwood

See also 
 "Single Man" (song), a 2019 song by Canadian country duo High Valley